Mathurapur is a village in the Manikchak CD block in the Malda Sadar subdivision of  Malda district in the state of West Bengal, India.

Geography

Location

Area overview
The area shown in the adjoining map is the physiographic sub-region known as the diara. It “is a relatively well drained flat land formed by the fluvial deposition of newer alluvium.” The most note-worthy feature is the Farakka Barrage across the Ganges. The area is a part of the Malda Sadar subdivision, which is an overwhelmingly rural region, but the area shown in the map has pockets of urbanization with 17 census towns, concentrated mostly in the Kaliachak I CD block. The bank of the Ganges between Bhutni and Panchanandapur (both the places are marked on the map), is the area worst hit  by left bank erosion, a major problem in the Malda area. The ruins of Gauda, capital of several empires, is located in this area.

Note: The map alongside presents some of the notable locations in the area. All places marked in the map are linked in the larger full screen map.

Demographics
According to the 2011 Census of India, Mathurapur had a total population of 12,755, of which 6,608 (52%) were males and 6,147 (52%) were females. Population in the age range 0–6 years was 1,712. The total number of literate persons in  Mathurapur was 11,043 (72.70% of the population over 6 years).

Education
Manikchak College was established in 2014 at Mathurapur. Affiliated wth the University of Gour Banga, it offers a honours course in Bengali and a general course in arts.

Healthcare
There is a primary health centre, with 4 beds at Mathurapur.

References

Villages in Malda district